The M6 is a metropolitan route in the Nelson Mandela Bay Municipality in South Africa that connects the eastern part of Despatch with the Uitenhage (Kariega) town centre.

Route 
The M6 begins at a junction with the M19 route east of the Despatch town centre (west of the Azalea Park suburb), just 190 metres north of the M19's interchange with the R75 Route. The M6 begins by going northwards as Uitenhage Road, then turning westwards, to reach another interchange with the R75 Route, where it leaves Despatch and enters Uitenhage. It continues westwards from the R75 junction as Union Avenue, then Caledon Street, to reach a junction with the R334 Route in the Uitenhage town centre, marking its end.

References 

Metropolitan Routes in Port Elizabeth
Nelson Mandela Bay Metropolitan Municipality